Xinfu Subdistrict is a subdistrict in Xinfu District, Fushun, Liaoning, China.

References

Xinfu District, Fushun
Township-level divisions of Liaoning